The Tomb of Sheikh Shahab ol Din Ahari is built by the Safavid dynasty and This building is located in Ahar.

Sources 

Mausoleums in Iran
National works of Iran